Edward Rowlands, Baron Rowlands  (born 23 January 1940) is a Welsh politician, who served as a Labour Party Member of Parliament for over thirty years, including a period as a junior minister in the 1960s and 1970s.

Education
He attended Rhondda Grammar School and Wirral Grammar School, and then King's College London, where he obtained a BA in History in 1962.

Political career
Rowlands was first elected to the Commons at the 1966 general election as Member of Parliament for Cardiff North, but lost his seat at the 1970 election. He was elected to represent Merthyr Tydfil at the 1972 by-election called after the death of the long-standing MP S. O. Davies. Rowlands served as Member of Parliament for Merthyr Tydfil until the constituency boundaries were redrawn and renamed for the 1983 general election, when he was returned for the new Merthyr Tydfil and Rhymney constituency. He was returned at three further elections before he stepped down at the 2001 general election.

He had served as a junior minister in Harold Wilson's governments, as Parliamentary Under-Secretary of State in the Welsh Office from 1969 to 1970, and again from 1974 to 1975, when he was appointed to the Foreign and Commonwealth Office. From 1976, under James Callaghan's premiership, he was Minister of State at the Foreign Office until Labour was defeated at the 1979 general election.

In a debate on the Falklands War on 3 April 1982, Rowlands revealed that the British were reading Argentine diplomatic traffic. Rowlands was criticised (but not prosecuted as per parliamentary privilege) for revealing this intelligence source, as the likely result of his disclosure was that the Argentinians would secure their systems and the intelligence would dry up.

He was appointed a Commander of the Order of the British Empire (CBE) in the 2002 Birthday Honours, and on 28 June 2004 was created a life peer, as Baron Rowlands, of Merthyr Tydfil and of Rhymney in the County of Mid-Glamorgan. In the House of Lords, as of July 2019, he is a member of the EU Justice Sub-Committee and the Delegated Powers and Regulatory Reform Committee.

Lord Rowlands sat on the Richard Commission which reported on 31 March 2004 on whether the National Assembly for Wales should have additional legislative powers.

References

1940 births
Alumni of King's College London
Living people
Welsh Labour Party MPs
Labour Party (UK) life peers
UK MPs 1966–1970
UK MPs 1970–1974
UK MPs 1974
UK MPs 1974–1979
UK MPs 1979–1983
UK MPs 1983–1987
UK MPs 1987–1992
UK MPs 1992–1997
UK MPs 1997–2001
People educated at Wirral Grammar School for Boys
Commanders of the Order of the British Empire
Ministers in the Wilson governments, 1964–1970
Life peers created by Elizabeth II